The Cube is a British television game show that aired on ITV from 22 August 2009 to 23 December 2021. It is hosted by Phillip Schofield.

The original series offered contestants the chance to win a top prize of £250,000 by completing challenges from within a 4m × 4m × 4m perspex cube. It was based on the idea that even straightforward tasks become extremely challenging when confined and put under pressure inside a small, enclosed area whilst surrounded by a live studio audience. Once inside, contestants could feel both claustrophobic and disoriented, affecting their concentration and abilities.

Using "state-of-the-art filming techniques", the show aims to demonstrate the intense anxiety which contestants undergo as they progress through each task. The challenges involve physical and mental tasks including catching, throwing, estimation, reacting, memorisation, and balancing. Colin McFarlane provides the disembodied voice of The Cube, who explains the rules of the games.

The show ran from 2009 to 2015, before returning as The Million Pound Cube in 2020, and again under its original title in 2021.

Format

Original series (2009–15)
The game is played by a single contestant within a transparent Perspex cube that measures 4 metres along each edge. The goal is to complete a series of seven games, each of which awards an increasing amount of prize money, before failing a total of nine times. Games are preselected for each individual contestant before the show to test their mental and physical faculties in various ways. A typical episode consists of two contestants' games; depending on how successful the contestants are and on editing, a contestant's game may split across two episodes.

The contestant begins with nine lives and loses one for every unsuccessful attempt at a game. The contestant must repeat the game until they either complete it or run out of lives; in the latter case, the game ends and all money is forfeited. When a contestant succeeds, they are shown a preview of the next game and can decide to either stop playing and keep their winnings or continue and risk the money. During a preview, the game is named and described by a male computer voice (provided by McFarlane) and demonstrated by "The Body," a woman dressed in a full-body jumpsuit and featureless metal mask. In the original series, McFarlane described the Body as "an expert in all games played within the Cube"; her real name is never stated on camera or listed in the credits.

Schofield occasionally comments on the difficulty that past contestants have had with a game and notes the average number of lives lost while playing it, in order to help the contestant decide whether to continue or stop. Friends and family members in the audience may offer advice on decision-making and techniques for playing the games. Certain games have specific restrictions added to increase their difficulty, such as a time limit or allowing the use of only one hand. If the contestant violates any such restriction, they immediately lose a life.

The contestant is given two forms of assistance, each of which may be used once. "Simplify" reduces the difficulty of a game, and may be used after any unsuccessful attempt. The exact nature of the change, such as by allowing more time or increasing the size of a target zone, is not revealed until the contestant chooses to use Simplify. The change remains in effect until the contestant either completes that game or runs out of lives. "Trial Run" allows the contestant to make one practice attempt at a game with no lives or money at stake, then decide if they want to play or stop. This assistance becomes available after they complete the first game, and can only be used upon the introduction of a new one.

The seventh and final game is worth a jackpot of £250,000; contestants who complete this game are said to have "beaten the Cube". It is a more difficult version of one of the six games a contestant previously played. In the original format, seven contestants have reached this level, with six choosing to stop and keep their winnings of £100,000. The seventh is runner Mo Farah, who successfully completed the final game on an episode of a 2012 celebrity series in which British gold medallist athletes competed for charity. 
On 25 October 2020, model Andrianna Christofi was revealed as the portrayer of the Body during the original run of the programme.

Revival (2020–21)
On 15 June 2020, after five years off the air, it was reported that The Cube would return with the jackpot being significantly increased. A month later, the return was confirmed, with the jackpot being raised to £1,000,000 and Phillip Schofield returning as host.

The revival aired in 2020 saw the prize quadrupled and the show renamed to The Million Pound Cube, with pairs of contestants taking part who have a pre-existing relationship. Some games involve only one contestant, while others involve both; in the former case, the team must decide which contestant will play the game once it is introduced. The "Trial Run" lifeline is replaced by a new one called "Swap," which allows the participant in a single-player game to swap places with their teammate. The seven-step money ladder is still used, with higher values at each step culminating in a top prize of £1 million. In the following series in 2021, the show returned to being known as simply The Cube, and the original money ladder was restored. Otherwise, the format remained the same as the previous series.   

When a two-player game is introduced, it is demonstrated by two Bodies dressed in jumpsuits and masks as in the original version. While the original Body displayed collar-length brown hair behind her mask, however, these two wear hoods that cover the backs and sides of their heads so that all physical features except their hands are entirely hidden from view. In the revival format, a team have managed to beat the sixth game for the very first time, which became the eighth contestant to have a chance to attempt the jackpot but decided to walk away with £100,000.

In April 2022, it was announced that The Cube was to be put on hiatus, with no immediate plans for a new series in the year, but did not rule out future series being commissioned.

During a rain delay while baseball fans waited for the decisive 5th game of the 2022 ALDS between the Cleveland Guardians and New York Yankees to begin on TBS, the network aired the show, which gained a minor cult following among the fans as the respective team subreddits watched The Cube as enthrallingly as they would have watched the game, which was delayed until the following evening.

Filming
Objective Productions first approached Channel 4 in 2008 with the format. It was made into a non-televised pilot by the channel, and was hosted by Justin Lee Collins. Channel 4 eventually decided not to commission the show because it would have been too expensive.

In February 2009, ITV purchased the rights to the show and filming began during April 2009 at Wembley's Fountain Studios. The Cube is one of the first shows to use the game freeze filming technique on a frequent basis, such as when a contestant jumps in celebration. The technique used is called "Bullet Time". Using specially designed cameras, it allows the viewer to see one side of the Cube before the action is frozen, spun to another face of the Cube, and then resumed. Slow-motion shots are again common to show action replays of the task a contestant just completed, or the critical moment of a game, to heighten the excitement of whether the contestant will succeed or fail.

The show makes extensive use of CGI to project images onto the walls and ceiling of the Cube, while a screen on the floor is also capable of showing images. These film techniques make the seemingly simple tasks that are put before the contestants seem much more exciting than they would normally be.

For series 8, which premiered on 1 March 2014, the show received a revamp, including a new studio set (the wave lines in the background were replaced by a circular replica of the letter C), new opening credits, a redesign of graphics, and several new games. The seven-game format and prize money structure remained the same.

During Series 10 in 2020, 120 Canon DSLR cameras were used for the Bullet Time rig, 3 × Red Dragon EPIC 6K cameras, and a separate rig was added to capture 3D photogrammetry and Volumetric data by UK Bullet Time specialists New World Designs Ltd Due to the closure of Fountain Studios not long after the ninth series had concluded, the show moved to Television Centre, London.

Prize money 
Originally, The Cube had a prize money structure starting at £1,000 and ending at the £250,000 jackpot; in the 2020 series, the jackpot was raised to £1,000,000.

Below is a breakdown of the prize money structure as used from Series 1–9, showing the game number and amount of prize money that can be won for successfully completing that game. If a player loses all their lives at any point, their game ends, and they leave with nothing. The only exception is for celebrities, playing for charity, in which £1,000 is awarded.

A different game is played at each of the first six levels; the seventh and final level was a game which contestants played before, but at a much higher difficulty level, such as decreased time or a smaller target area.

Transmissions

Ratings

Series 1

Series 2

Series 3

Series 4

Series 5

Series 6

Series 7

Series 8

Series 9

Awards

International versions
The format has been sold to international broadcasters. In the case of the Greek, Turkish and U.S. versions from 2010, only a pilot was ever made.

Below is a breakdown of the countries that have created their own versions along with other information including the Jackpot available and broadcast dates.

Most versions of The Cube aired until 2017 used a version of the British intro, for example in the Arab World, Chinese, German, Italian, Russian, Saudi Arabian, and Ukrainian versions, whilst the French and Spanish versions used custom-composed cues whilst maintaining the British music for the games. When the original British version returned, the Australian and Dutch versions also used the new intro, with the Dutch version adding new sound effects.

Legend:
 Currently airing  
 No longer airing  
 Non-broadcast pilot  

Note

The UK version of The Cube is also formerly being simulcast in Ireland by Virgin Media One. It is broadcast in New Zealand on TV1, and in Australia on the Nine Network. Old series were broadcast in Bosnia and Herzegovina by RTRS, in Serbia by IQS Life and in Singapore by MediaCorp Channel 5. The American version of The Cube was previously broadcast in Hong Kong by ViuTV.

Filming locations
The German, Italian, Portuguese, Saudi Arabian, Spanish versions, and the 2010 U.S. pilot of The Cube were filmed at The Fountain Studios in London using the British set and games. Other international versions have created their own studio sets. The Chinese version of the show is filmed at the Zhabei Gymnasium in Shanghai; the Ukrainian version of the show is filmed at the Antonov Serial Production Plant in Kyiv; the Russian version of the show is filmed at the Ostankino Technical Center in Moscow; the Arabian version is filmed at the Dubai Studio City in Dubai; the French version of the show is filmed in La Plaine Saint-Denis, near Paris and the 2021 U.S. version is filmed in Atlanta.

Top prize winners 
Across all versions of the show, 6 contestants have won the final game and taken away the jackpot.

Merchandise
An electronic board game based on the series was made available in stores from November 2010. As of June 2011, the game has been discontinued by most main retailers. The game comes with an electronic handheld system featuring games such as Time Freeze and Stop Zone, as well as 9 balls- six 18mm blow moulded balls, 1 30mm EVA foam ball, 1 25mm hard ball and one 50mm hard ball. The balls are used for different reasons and the foam ball is used for most games with a ball. For Multisphere, all balls are used unless it is being played in a room with hard floors, in that case, eight balls are used. Tubes are used for almost every physical game for starting positions, voids, tubes, towers, and columns.

Other equipment in the board game are track pieces, discs, clips, z-shaped platform pieces, cannons, blocks, a ball flipper, a beam and card pieces, and a 7 cm x 7 cm x 7 cm plastic cube for playing a series of physical games. The cube is used for a container and to connect onto the cube platform for the electronic games. A reducer also comes with the cube, allowing it to reduce the size of the open top of the cube. This is, in almost all games involving the cube, removed in a simplify. Many well-known and classic games are here as well as new games such as Roller, Catch, Retrieval and Bounce, everyday life games and interesting and complex games.

Around the time of the release of the board game, a Game App version of the series was made available via the iTunes store for use on the iPod Touch, iPhone, and iPad. This app version originally featured sixteen games from the series: Balance, Cylinder, Descent, Drop Zone, Focus, Multisphere, Perimeter, Precision, Quantity, Reaction, Revolution, Shatter, Stabilise, Stop Zone, and Time Freeze. The first update for the game came in April 2011 with Pulse added Another update for the game was made available in June 2011, adding a further free game, Succession, and making eight games available via in-app purchase in 2 "packs" Exact, Pathfinder, Totalise and Tower in Pack one and Invert, Composure, Calculate and Navigate in Pack two. A further update was made available in October 2011, adding a further free game, Axis. 2 further games followed in 2012, Eliminate in April, and Symmetry in October. In February 2013, Chase, which at that time had not been shown on TV, was made available. Almost a year later on 21 February 2014 Avoid was added. The most recent update came on 19 May 2014 when 4 games new games were made available via In-App Purchase. These new games were Reset, Plummet, Selection, and Tally all of which are new games from the most recent series. Following the show's revival in 2020, the app saw the first appearance of a two-player game: Circumvent, and a new 4 game pack featuring Cascade, Downfall, Loop, and Dual Stop. In March 2021, three new two-player games were added: Dual Extraction, Revolve, and Interchange. There are currently 42 games available to play in the App version.

On 9 November 2012, a Cube game was released on consoles for the first time. It was available on the Nintendo Wii, PlayStation 3 and Nintendo 3DS. 33 games are playable in this version including two unseen new games: Flight Path (already played in international versions) and Retrace. If the Cube is beaten, Extreme Mode is unlocked, featuring more extreme versions of five popular games: Revolution, Pathfinder, Perimeter, Rebound, and Momentum.

References

External links
 
 

2000s British game shows
2009 British television series debuts
2010s British game shows
2020s British game shows
2021 British television series endings
BAFTA winners (television series)
British television series revived after cancellation
English-language television shows
ITV game shows
Television series by All3Media
Television shows set in London